This is a list of fictional characters from the TV series VR Troopers.

VR Troopers

Ryan Steele
Ryan Steele / VR Ryan (portrayed by Brad Hawkins) is the son of Tyler Steele and leader of the VR Troopers .  Ryan learns the nature of his father's mysterious disappearance when he, Kaitlin Star and J.B. Reese are all recruited by Professor Hart to become V.R. Troopers. Ryan's responsibilities sometimes take a backseat to an obsession with finding his father. Ryan is the principal character of the series, directly linked through blood to the unfolding agenda of Grimlord...who uses Tyler in areas to increase his evil hold on virtual reality, and to continue his war against the Troopers to conquer their (read: our) universe. Every episode begins and ends with Ryan reflecting on his father's teachings at a Buddhist Temple where Tyler trained young Ryan in martial arts and in other lessons in life. Ryan's obsessive quest to locate his dad is mellowed by a desire not to see his friends, or their world, suffer. Ryan remains hopeful of ultimately reuniting with Tyler.

Such indeed occurred in the series' first season, but only briefly. Ryan discovered that Dark Heart, one of Grimlord's deadliest cyborg-warriors, was actually Tyler, whose mind had been wiped. Ryan freed his father (who became human again), but Tyler was recaptured by Grimlord.

Ryan's virtual reality Lightning Hand Command (his patented finisher), and Internal Gyro Command. His VR vehicles-arsenal includes a "Turbo Cycle." Whenever a "Battle Grid" emergency arises, Ryan and his fellow Troopers employ alternate costumes to fight invading Skugs. His signature color is blue.

Despite being a team player, Ryan typically fights his VR battles alone; due to the differing Japanese series used to create V.R. Troopers, Ryan's Japanese counterpart was only one warrior against a mutant army. In the "linking" U.S. footage, Ryan's joint battles (alongside his fellow Troopers) are limited to the Battle Grid and the Skybase cockpit. As footage of one loner Metal Hero series, Choujinki Metalder ran out, Saban replaced it with another: Uchuu Keiji Shaider. 

In the five-part story "Quest For Power", Ryan's powers are depleted after rescuing his father and the other two Troopers from Grimlord's cavernous dungeon in reality. Ryan is then given new armor, powers, vehicles (including the Drill Tank, Blue Hawk, and Nitro Cycle) and weapons (including a laser pistol and his new finisher, the Laser Saber; which, like J.B's Laser Lance, only functioned as a regular sword in combat). He would also use a Shoulder Cannon similar to J.B's Technobazooka (always used on Grimlord's air forces, never on any monsters). After Ryan’s father rebuilt the V.R. Skybase (it had been destroyed by Grimlords new fighter in, “Quest for Power: part 4), he gave Ryan a command phrase that could make the Skybase transform into the V.R. Troopertron. His reunion with Tyler would be brief, as Tyler branched out globally to find a way of destroying Grimlord. Ryan was charged with "holding the fort" until his father returned, which happened in the Christmas episode "Santa's Secret Trooper".

As the leader of the VR Troopers, Ryan was the only character to have two different uniforms since there was not enough stock footage of his Red/Blue uniform for the second season.

Ryan's mother was never seen throughout the series' run; since neither Ryan nor his father even mentioned her, it can be presumed that either Ryan's mother and Tyler are either not married, divorced, or she died sometime during his early childhood.

J.B. Reese
J.B. Reese / VR J.B. (portrayed by Michael Calvin Hollander) is a computer genius and a martial arts-black belt. J.B. is obsessed with technology and constantly relies on it for solutions. But his ongoing experience as a VR Trooper has taught him to appreciate life outside such conveniences. J.B. is quite capable of holding his own in battle, armed with a laser gun and a Laser Lance; he often uses the latter as a finishing maneuver against Grimlord's monsters and robots, but only uses it as a regular sword in combat known as the Super Saber. Once he forms the Laser Lance by extending a second blade on his Super Saber, he usually impales a mutant, who then (A) surrenders; (B) has "heartburn"; or (C) is unaffected (only Mechanoid, Photobot, Fanbot, and Electrobot are immune to the Laser Lance impalement and only Fanbot was immune to it altogether), typically the mutant surrenders. 

If the mutant does surrender, J.B. destroys it anyway via rapid and repeated slashes; the mutant overheats, falls over and explodes. Also in J.B's arsenal is the VR Techno-Bazooka (basically a double-barrel cannon); J.B. projects a giant virtual image of himself to pull the trigger. The VR Techno-Bazooka is always used on Grimlord's air forces, never on any monsters with one notable exception, Fanbot, a mutant that couldn't be hurt by any other arsenal (including the Skybase). When the battle grows too dangerous for reality, J.B. activates a Vortex Command (via a button on his waist) to transport himself and the enemy into virtual reality. He also uses the VR Skybase (which can transform into Troopertron, a giant robot, despite that fact that the Metal Hero footage for J.B. had his counterpart giving the command, it was given to Ryan), and battle cruiser, when needed; his vehicles-arsenal also includes a VR Fighter bike (also known as the Sky cycle).  His signature color is black.

Throughout the series' run, it was never explained what J.B's initials stood for. Also, while his father was seen in a few episodes, J.B's mother was never seen or mentioned at all.

Kaitlin Star
Kaitlin Star / VR Kaitlin (portrayed by Sarah Brown) is a reporter and photographer for a newspaper called Underground Voice Daily. When she wasn't saving the world as a heroine, she was saving it through her journalism and photography. As a Trooper, Kaitlin didn't have as many personal weapons and attacks. She carried around a hand pistol, occasionally a hatchet weapon, and later gained the ability to split into two dubbed "VR Kaitlin Double Team." She mainly fought alongside J.B. and often served as backup for both male troopers via the VR Skybase and the VR Battle Cruiser. Kaitlin, on two events, demonstrated the ability to heal a fellow trooper by transferring some of her power to re-energize the other Trooper. Although Kaitlin never finished off a mutant herself, she and J.B. would often combine their laser pistol blasts in a "VR Double Team", usually stunning and weakening a mutant, with a few exceptions. This is not to be confused with the "VR Kaitlin Double Team", where she summons an exact duplicate of herself to assist her in battle (the reason for this is because her counterparts are actually two people from Spielban). She drives a Mazda Familia Hatchback, which was modified by Prof. Hart to fly and thus making travel and rescue operations faster.  Also to note unlike Ryan and J.B., Kaitlin's parents were never mentioned or seen in the series. Her signature color is red. In the VR Troopers pilot, instead of Star, Kaitlin's last name was Hall.

Allies

Jeb
Jeb (portrayed by Zeb, voiced by Kerrigan Mahan impersonating Jack Nicholson) is Ryan's pet Redbone Coonhound, whom he had since he was young. Jeb was accidentally subjected to a power surge in part two of "The Battle Begins" that gave him the ability to speak. Ryan had him promise that he would never speak when around other people, so Jeb is usually silent except while in the lab or when making a snide comment to Percy (who usually thinks it's Ryan who said it). Jeb is known for both his mischievous personality and his humorous demeanor. Often, Jeb serves as comic relief, and both Percy and Mrs. Rooney are frequent victims to his antics. Jeb was based on Metalder's talking cyborg Doberman, Springer. Jeb had to fight as a Trooper once when he and Ryan accidentally switched bodies. He also has a voracious appetite eating any food lying around, including food from Ryan and the other Troopers. However, Jeb does serve as a valuable assistant to the Troopers, even demonstrating some technological abilities and problem-solving skills, filling the role for the Troopers that Alpha 5 (and later 6) did for the Power Rangers.

Professor Hart

Professor Horatio Hart (portrayed by Julian Combs) is the mentor and serves a Zordon-like role. He was a computerized being who would provide and construct the necessary arsenal and equipment that the Troopers would use throughout the series. Hart was once a flesh and blood human who worked with Tyler Steele on the VR Trooper project. But one day, he was mortally injured by Grimlord; to keep Hart alive, Tyler virtualized his brain. In his most notable role in the episode "Good Trooper, Bad Trooper", he gave Ryan his own Virtualizer to allow Ryan to battle his evil clone after the clone stole the real Ryan's Virtualizer and took control of the Skybase. In early pilot footage for the show (as seen in a VR Troopers promo featured on the Power Rangers Official Fan Club video), Hart was originally portrayed by a Caucasian male slightly resembling Albert Einstein.

Supporting characters
 Tao Chong (portrayed by Richard Rabago): Tao is proprietor of Tao Dojo, an old friend of Tyler's, and the Troopers' sensei. Tao is an old fashioned man and occasionally his advice and teachings have proven useful for the Troopers, even though he is unaware of their identities. However, it hints that Tao has probably figured out their identities.
 Woody Stocker (portrayed by Michael Sorich): Woody is the editor-in-chief of Underground Voice Daily paper and Kaitlin's goofy boss. Woody's workspace is filled with novelty toys, and he always comes to work with a different hat. On the side, he comes up with new snack recipes, some good (such as nachos) and some that are just weird (like marshmallow or tuna-and-peanut-butter-covered nachos). One of his main catchphrases is an enthusiastic "What an ide-e-e-a!"
 Percival "Percy" Rooney III (portrayed by Aaron Pruner): Percy is this show's version of Bulk and Skull with a few superficial similarities to the character of Miles Silverberg from the TV show Murphy Brown. He is Mayor Abner Rooney's nephew and Kaitlin's so-called rival. He is highly allergic to animals (mostly dogs) which means Jeb always enjoys pulling pranks on Percy. At work, Percy often tries to outdo Kaitlin, but usually ends up getting into trouble with Woody, even Grimlord's forces, or occasionally other people. He is also the stereotypical nerd by his appearance and voice.
 Tyler Steele (portrayed by David Carr): Tyler is Ryan Steele's father. In the middle of season one, in the four-part "Defending Dark Heart" series, it was revealed that Grimlord's warrior Dark Heart (Topgunder in Metalder) is actually Tyler himself, after being captured and brainwashed. When Ryan brought Dark Heart to the lab in part 2, the Troopers decided to transfer memories (mostly of Ryan's childhood and the VR Trooper project with the Professor) from the lab's computer and their VR visors to Dark Heart to get him to remember. The transfer was successful and Dark Heart had become Tyler Steele in mind, but not yet body. But even after that, Dark Heart decided to return to Grimlord's dungeon. In part 3, after attacking the lab, Grimlord sent Ryan an invitation to rescue his father without the aide of his two fellow Troopers, and Ryan accepted knowing it was a trap. In part 4, he successfully rescued Tyler on his Turbo Cycle and, as Grimlord's forces continued the attack on the Professor's lab, the two headed to a long and forgotten secret lab in the mountains to restore him to human form. Grimlord's forces attacked that lab, so they headed to the Virtual Dungeon, with Grimlord threatening to self-destruct the dungeon and replace the oxygen with poison in an attempt to destroy the Steeles. Tyler was successfully restored to his human form, but was recaptured by Grimlord and taken back to virtual reality. During the time that followed, Ryan fought for video footage and the proof that his father was still alive in the episode "Message from Space". Ryan saw his father in the episode "Trooper Out of Time" when he traveled to the past and saved his younger half from Strickland in a Skug fight, but had to return to the present before having a chance to speak to him. In the five-part "Quest for Power" mini-series, Grimlord transferred all of Tyler's knowledge of virtual reality into a green energy prism to upgrade to the Virtual Dark Fortress and build a new army; Ryan and Jeb attempt to rescue him as Grimlord successfully self-destructs the Virtual Dungeon, but get trapped in the explosion and eventually survive. When Tyler was held prisoner with the other two Troopers in a cavernous temporary dungeon in reality, Ryan, knowing his powers were almost gone, went against Professor Hart's advice and headed to the cave to battle Grimlord's remaining old army to rescue all three of them. The rescue was successful, but even though the Professor recharged Ryan's powers before sending him to battle, the battle itself ultimately resulted in the loss of his powers and the melting of his Virtualizer. The Troopers then turned to Tao to revive Tyler, who then began work on Ryan's new powers, which required a perfectly structured crystal for Ryan's new Virtualizer. In the episode "The Negative Factor", he would appear on the lab's screens to inform Ryan about the new VR Troopertron, a robot created using the Skybase. Ryan would later see his father again in the episode "The Disk" featuring a scientist and his daughter who brought a computer program that, while programmed to destroy Grimlord's world, also contained glitches in the Troopers' powers; the reunion was short-lived as Tyler had to travel with the scientist to Norway to work on a new computer program designed to destroy Grimlord's world. His final appearance since his rescue was in the Christmas episode "Santa's Secret Trooper", in which he got to ride in Santa Claus' sleigh. All appearances of him thereafter were in flashbacks.
 Young Ryan (portrayed by Farrand Thompson): This is Ryan's younger self often seen at the beginning of every episode. Whenever Ryan recalls his past, his younger self is often seen with Tyler. Most of the time, Young Ryan is training or doing father-son activities. He does get the spotlight in two episodes. In one episode, he and the other Troopers are reduced to the ages of 10-year-old children. As kids, the Troopers only have limited time to defeat Grimlord's army. After young J.B. defeated the incoming air fleet with his Technobazooka and Cranoid with his Laser Lance, they regrouped in the Skybase where they retroformed after their limited Trooper time was up. As kids, they had to fly the Skybase to defeat Grimlord's remaining air fleet. They had one final fling as kids before Professor Hart restored them to their proper ages. Young Ryan also played a role in another episode when Ziktor sent Strickland through time to capture him, but his older half came into the past to save him; the older Ryan then saw Tyler, but had to return to the present before having a chance to speak to either of them.

Villains

Recurring characters
 Dr. Ulysses T. Poindexter (portrayed by James Douglas): A nutty professor who has unknowingly proved to be a true asset to the Troopers. When he first appeared, he approached Kaitlin with a new revolutionary virtual engine research that he wanted her to write about. This research, with a little help from J.B., gave birth to J.B's VR Fighter Bike. He proved useful once again when the Trooper's Virtualizers were damaged. At that time, he learned their identities which put him in danger with Grimlord. Though Poindexter's memory was promptly erased, his assistance was still valuable when Kaitlin was injured by the Red Python. He then proved helpful in the series finale when Galileo the Robot was kidnapped, as he placed a homing device on the robot to help the Troopers rescue it.
 Mayor Abner Rooney (portrayed by Randy Swerdlick): The mayor of Cross World City and Percy's uncle. Mayor Rooney is in a position of power, but has shown to be a rather inept and spineless man. He has allowed himself to bossed around and threatened by Ziktor and also finds himself at the mercy of his wife who has more backbone than he does. Mayor Rooney's redeeming quality is that he supports the efforts of the VR Troopers.
 Mrs. Prudence Rooney (portrayed by Sonja Ecker): The Mayor's wife and Percy's aunt. Percy apparently got his stuck-up attitude from her as she is quite a snooty woman. She'd rather be doing something else rather than go around town and support her husband's campaigns. Also when Jeb's not picking on Percy, he is instead pulling pranks on Mrs. Rooney.
 Strickland (portrayed by Glen McDougal): A Skug that works for Ziktor Industries as an inventor. Skugs have taken on many human forms, but the most recurring form aside from Karl Ziktor's secretaries is Strickland. Strickland occasionally disturbs Karl Ziktor with a new invention to use against the Troopers. He has created such devices that turned the Troopers into children as well as turn J.B. into the Transmutant. Once, Ryan personally confronted Strickland when they both went into the past and met Young Ryan. Strickland quickly transformed into a Skug and along with a group of about 4 more Skugs, attacked the Ryans at the ancient temple (which is the one seen at the start and end of most episodes). He and the Skugs ended up defeated, but this was not the last of Strickland. In Season 2, Strickland devised a potion that could make anyone fall in love with each other. He would mix it into boxes of chocolates and anyone who ate one would be affected (the plan was for Grimlord to take over the world while everyone was distracted in love). Later, Strickland was able to turn dangerous convict "Nutty" Nichols into the Nutty Monster after springing him out of prison. Even later in season 2, all three Troopers confronted him while investigating a duplication laptop computer factory known as the Duplitron.

See also
 List of villains in VR Troopers

References

External links
 
 TV.com's episode guide

Characters
VR Troopers
VR Troopers
VR Troopers
VR Troopers
VR Troopers